Laurie Thompson (26 February 1938 – 8 June 2015) was a British academic and translator, noted for his translations of Swedish literature into English.

Thompson was born in York, England, and lived in northern Sweden for a few years.  He was the editor of Swedish Book Review between 1983 and 2002, and a lecturer at the University of Wales, Aberystwyth, and the University of Wales, Lampeter.

Bibliography
Quicksand by Henning Mankell, 2016 
The Man from Beijing by Henning Mankell, 2010
Italian Shoes by Henning Mankell, 2009
The Mind's Eye by Håkan Nesser, 2008Kennedy's Brain, by Henning Mankell, 2007
The Return by Håkan Nesser, 2007
Frozen Tracks by Åke Edwardson, 2007
Shadows in the Twilight by Henning Mankell, 2007
Borkmann's Point by Håkan Nesser, 2006
The Man Who Smiled by Henning Mankell, 2006
Depths by Henning Mankell, 2006
Playing, Writing, Wrestling, six Swedish writers, 2006
Never End by Åke Edwardson, 2006
Sun and Shadow by Åke Edwardson, 2005
A bridge to the stars by Henning Mankell, 2005
Art Goes Underground, Art in the Stockholm metro, 2004
I Die, but the Memory Lives on by Henning Mankell, 2004
The Return of the Dancing Master by Henning Mankell, 2003
Popular Music from Vittula by Mikael Niemi, 2003
The Dogs of Riga by Henning Mankell, 2001
Night Watch by Malin Lindroth, 2000
After the Campfires by Per Jorner, 1999
The White Lioness by Henning Mankell, 1998
Johnny, my Friend by Peter Pohl, 1991
Swedish State Cultural Policy, 1990
Pithy Poems by Stig Dagerman, 1989
The Black Period of Adalbert, 1988
Stig Dagerman, 1983
Swedish Proses, 1982
People and Places, 1969

Awards
2003 Swedish Academy award for introduction of Swedish culture abroad.
1986 Honorary Doctor at Linköping University

References

Swedish–English translators
Academics of Aberystwyth University
Academics of the University of Wales, Lampeter
1938 births
2015 deaths
20th-century translators